Isodendrion is a plant genus in the family Violaceae.

Species
Plants of the World Online recognises 4 accepted species. More detailed phylogeny is provided in two papers from 2014 and 2018.
 Isodendrion hosakae 
 Isodendrion laurifolium  
 Isodendrion longifolium 
 Isodendrion pyrifolium

References

 
Malpighiales genera